"Paying the Price of Love" is the first single from the Bee Gees' 20th studio album, Size Isn't Everything (1993). The song reached the top 10 in Belgium and Portugal and the top 40 in Austria, Germany, the Netherlands, Switzerland, and the United Kingdom. In the United States, it charted on the Billboard Hot 100, reaching number 74, and peaked within the top 30 on the Billboard Adult Contemporary chart. The promotional video for the song shows the brothers performing the song as holograms on a futuristic version of MTV.

Critical reception
Alan Jones from Music Week gave the song three out of five. He wrote, "Potently re-emerging at what seems like more regular intervals than Haley's [sic] Comet, the Bee Gees should be launched into another chart orbit by this, their first single for Polydor since the early Seventies. The brothers' sense of strong melodic material is still intact, as is Barry's falsetto. Keith Cohen's sparse house/jack remix should put this on the dancefloor and, with radio already taking the bait, a substantial hit is not out of the question."

Track listings

UK 7-inch and cassette single, European CD single
 "Paying the Price of Love" – 4:12
 "My Destiny" – 3:42

UK CD single
 "Paying the Price of Love"
 "Jive Talkin'"
 "Night Fever"
 "How Deep Is Your Love"

US 12-inch single
A1. "Paying the Price of Love" (Jellybean mix 1) – 6:09
A2. "Paying the Price of Love" (Jellybean mix 2) – 6:09
B1. "Paying the Price of Love" (The Ocean Drive mix) – 6:08
B2. "Decadance" (classic house mix) – 8:42

US maxi-CD single
 "Paying the Price of Love" – 4:12
 "Paying the Price of Love" (Jellybean mix 1 edit) – 4:05
 "Paying the Price of Love" (Jellybean mix 1) – 6:09
 "Paying the Price of Love" (The Ocean Drive mix) – 6:08
 "Decadance" (classic house mix) – 8:42

Australian CD single
 "Paying the Price of Love" (7-inch mix)
 "Paying the Price of Love" (KC mix)
 "My Destiny"
 "Paying the Price of Love" (The Ocean Drive mix)

Personnel
 Barry Gibb – lead vocals, rhythm guitar
 Robin Gibb – harmony and backing vocals
 Maurice Gibb – backing and harmony vocals, keyboards
 Alan Kendall – lead guitar
 Tim Moore – keyboards, synthesizer, programming
 Tim Cansfield – lead guitar
 George "Chocolate" Perry – bass guitar
 Trevor Murrell – drums
 Luis Jardim – percussion

Charts

Weekly charts

Year-end charts

References

1993 singles
1993 songs
Bee Gees songs
Polydor Records singles
Songs written by Barry Gibb
Songs written by Maurice Gibb
Songs written by Robin Gibb